is the sixth single by Japanese singer Yōko Oginome. Written by Mai Arai, the single was released on August 5, 1985 by Victor Entertainment.

Background and release
The song was used in the TBS drama special . The B-side, "Sweet Vacation", was used by the Japan Ministry of Posts and Telecommunications for their "Summer Greetings" campaign.

The music video features Oginome doing different activities in New York City, from jogging in Central Park to exercising at a dance studio in Manhattan.

"Kokoro no Mama ni (I'm Just a Lady)" peaked at No. 16 on Oricon's singles chart and sold over 68,000 copies.

Oginome re-recorded the song with a synth-pop arrangement for her 1987 greatest hits album Pop Groover: The Best.

Track listing

Charts

References

External links

1985 singles
Yōko Oginome songs
Japanese-language songs
Victor Entertainment singles